Inci or INCI may refer to:

 Tumpong, Philippine bamboo flute 
 İnci, Turkish name
 INCI, the International Nomenclature of Cosmetic Ingredients